Udayamarthandapuram Bird Sanctuary is a .45 km2 (0.2 sq mi) protected area in Tiruvarur District, Tamil Nadu, India at .

In 1999, this sanctuary was declared as a protected area. It has been designated as a protected Ramsar site since 2022.

Fauna 

A notable aspect of the sanctuary is the large number of purple moorhen and openbill storks during February and March.

Notes 
The Udayamarthandapuram Bird Sanctuary covers an area of around 45 km2 and is fed by an irrigation tank that receives water from the Mettur Dam. The tank remains dry between the months of April and August.

During the  months of February and March, purple-moorhens and openbill storks can be seen here. Other migratory birds in the sanctuary include the white-ibis, Indian reef heron, white-necked stork, grey-heron, coot, night heron, purple-heron, little cormorant, spoonbill and darter.

From September through December, the bird population inhabiting the sanctuary rises to around 10,000 birds. The ideal season to visit this sanctuary is during the months of November and December.

References

Bird sanctuaries of Tamil Nadu
Protected areas with year of establishment missing
Tiruvarur district
Ramsar sites in India